Lori Laitman is an American composer who has composed multiple operas, choral works, and over 300 songs.

Life 
Laitman was born in Long Beach, New York, in 1955.

Laitman has set texts by classical and contemporary poets (including those who were murdered in the Holocaust) in her compositions. She graduated magna cum laude  from Yale College and received her MM from the Yale School of Music.

Laitman has received commissions from the BBC, The Royal Philharmonic Society, The Grant Park Music Festival, Opera America, Opera Colorado, Lyric Fest of Philadelphia, Washington Master Chorale, Wolfgang Holzmair and Music of Remembrance.

Laitman was featured on Thomas Hampson’s Song of America radio series and website and interviewed by him on the  Idagio platform. The Yale School of Music presented her with the Ian Mininberg Distinguished Service Award at Yale Commencement on May 21, 2018. She is one of four composers on baritone Stephen Powell's 2021 Grammy-nominated CD American Composers at Play. Laitman has an extensive discography.

Works

Living in the Body 
This six-song cycle was commissioned and premiered through a Special Projects Grant from the College of Liberal Arts and Social Sciences at Georgia Southern University, for Saxophonist Carolyn Bryan and soprano Sandra McClain. Set to poetry by Joyce Sutphen, Living in the Body explores themes such as grief, loss, the past, and their emotional toll on the body of someone looking towards the second half of their life. The cycle was composed between September 14t and December 3, 2001, and was premiered on March 7, 2002 at the North American Saxophone Alliance Biennial Conference at the University of North Texas.

This cycle is one of few existing for soprano and saxophone; a normatively unorthodox pairing in Western classical repertoire inspired by Laitman's real life friendships.

The Scarlet Letter 
Laitman created the opera The Scarlet Letter based on the novel The Scarlet Letter by Nathaniel Hawthorne.  It was commissioned by The University of Central Arkansas through Robert Holden and the UCA Opera program, premiered there in November 2008 and received its professional premiere in May 2016 by Colorado Opera. The libretto is by David Mason. Huffington Post ran an interview with Laitman, and the May 2016 issue of Opera News had a feature about Laitman and The Scarlet Letter. Naxos released the CD in Aug. 2017. Performances took place at The University of Oklahoma in February 2022 and at Wichita State University in April 2022.

Vedem 
Laitman and Mason also collaborated on Vedem, a Holocaust oratorio commissioned by Music of Remembrance. Indianapolis Opera's double bill of Vedem and Brundibar was produced March 18–20, 2022 (after several Coronavirus delays). It was the first time an opera by a woman was presented by the company.

Ludlow 
Laitman and Mason continued to develop the opera Ludlow, based on Mason's verse novel about the 1914 mining disaster in Ludlow, Colorado.

The Three Feathers 
Laitman created The Three Feathers children's opera with librettist Dana Gioia, based on a Grimm's fairy tale.  It was commissioned by the Center for the Arts at Virginia Tech. The work premiered in conjunction with VA Tech, Opera Roanoke and the Blacksburg Children's Chorale in Oct. 2015 in a production directed by Beth Greenberg and conducted by Scott Williamson. Huffington Post ran a feature on the opera. The children's outreach version, which is condensed to under an hour, was premiered by Florida State University in February 2016. Seattle Opera commissioned a 5 voice/piano abridged version which toured Seattle schools from January through June 2018. Hartt College of Music premiered the abridged orchestral version, and L'arietta Productions in Singapore presented the international premiere, marking the first time an opera by a woman was performed in Singapore. Opera Steamboat presented the full production on August 12–13, 2022. Solo Opera is presenting the full opera in September 2023 at the Lesher Center for the Arts in Walnut Creek, CA.

Uncovered 
Uncovered is Laitman's opera with Leah Lax, based on Lax's memoir. It was a 2018 finalist for the Domenic J. Pelliccioti Opera Composition Prize. It has been co-commissioned by Utah State University, City Lyric Opera and The New York Opera Society. Utah State premiered the work at The Caine Lyric Theatre in Logan, UT on March 31, 2022 in a production directed by Beth Greenberg. City Lyric Opera presented the NYC premiere November 16–19, 2022 at the HERE Arts Center in NY.

Unsung 
Laitman received a 2015 Centennial Commission from the Baltimore Symphony Orchestra with Music Director Marin Alsop for an orchestral piece to celebrate the BSO's 100th anniversary. Unsung premiered in September 2016.

Are Women People? 
Laitman's commission from the Howard Hansen Institute for American Music at the Eastman School of Music and the Susan B. Anthony Center for Women's Leadership produced "Are Women People?" .  The piece was created for SATB vocal quartet and piano 4 hands,  This piece uses texts by Alice Duer Miller, Susan B. Anthony and also the 19th Amendment of the Constitution. The work premiered at Eastman School of Music in March 2017. The premiere recording of the work is featured on the May 2021 CD release on Acis: Are Women People? — The Songs of Lori Laitman.

The Imaginary Photo Album 
Her BBC/Royal Philharmonic Society commission for soprano Katharina Konradi was first broadcast on October 25, 2020 at the Wigmore Hall, London, live, but with a reduced audience due to lockdown.

Critical reviews 
Fanfare Magazine described Laitman as "one of the most talented and intriguing of living composers."

Gramophone wrote about The Scarlet Letter: "The first thing that leaps into one's ears is the sheer beauty of the music. Laitman has devoted much of her career to the art song, and her ability to meld words with lyrical, often soaring lines is on abundant display in her opera."

The Journal of Singing wrote "It is difficult to think of anyone before the public today who equals her exceptional gifts for embracing a poetic text and giving it new and deeper life through music."

"Lori Laitman's central greatness comes not from wielding numerous and complicated elements in complex ways, but rather from her almost uncanny skill for breathing new life into a text through music. When it comes to crafting art songs, nothing else counts at all if this central matter isn’t right. Laitman’s skill in this regard is unsurpassed among current art song composers."

Her latest CD, The Ocean of Eternity, released on Acis, was named an Opera News Critic's Choice — "unmistakable...masterful" and garnered additional praise from Gramophone  - "delicacy and ingenuity combine"; Textura — "artistry of the highest order"; Medium.com — "sumptuously beautiful, and witty...utterly fabulous"; American Record Guide — "gripping and thought-provoking" and
The Journal of Singing — "There seems to be no limit to the wellspring of Lori Latiman’s com- positional inspiration...Every facet of Laitman’s genius is on vivid display here, but the disk especially celebrates her bountiful, wide-ranging imagination. Whatever the task, challenge or opportunity may be, Laitman engages with it in a way that scrupulously serves the text while shedding new and illuminating light on the world and the human condition. Her music always sounds completely fresh and new..."

In 2022 Laitman started making films of her art songs in conjunction with Positive Note in the UK. The first, Sarong Song, is a hybrid presentation of classical song, poetry, and original art and can be found on YouTube. It was selected by The Swedish International Film Festival and The Montreal Independent Film Festival, Yale in Hollywood Film Festival, American Golden Picture International Film Festival, won for best composer at the Mindfield Film Festival in Albuquerque, and was a finalist in the 4theatre.com Film Festival.

References

 Dormady Eisenberg, Susan, "Lines Written At The Falls" (November 2005), Classical Singer.
 Dormady Eisenberg, Susan, "From Art Song To Opera" (October 2009), Classical Singer.

External links
 Official website- Lori Laitman
 website for The Scarlet Letter opera — Lori Laitman

1955 births
20th-century classical composers
21st-century American composers
21st-century classical composers
American women classical composers
American classical composers
American opera composers
Living people
People from Long Beach, New York
Yale School of Music alumni
Women opera composers
20th-century American women musicians
20th-century American composers
21st-century American women musicians
20th-century women composers
21st-century women composers
Albany Records artists